Aaron Michel Pilkington (born 1991) is the Republican state representative for District 69, which includes portions of Johnson and Pope counties in northwestern Arkansas.

Pilkington is a graduate of Fairmont Senior High School in Fairmont, West Virginia, where he was elected class President. He obtained his undergraduate education at Washington & Jefferson College in Washington, Pennsylvania, where he was a member of the fraternity Delta Tau Delta. He also attended the University of Arkansas for Medical Sciences and graduated with a master's degree in health care administration. Pilkington serves on two House committees: (1)  Public Health, Welfare, and Labor and (2)  House City, County, and Local Affairs Committee. He resides in Clarksville in Johnson County.

First elected in 2016, when he unseated the Democratic Representative Betty Overbey, Pilkington won reelection to his second legislative term in the general election held on November 6, 2018. With 4,016 votes (58.4 percent), he defeated another Democrat, Eddie King, who polled 3,576 votes (41.6 percent).

References

External links
 Aaron Pilkington at ballotpedia.org

1991 births
Living people
University of Arkansas for Medical Sciences alumni
Republican Party members of the Arkansas House of Representatives
People from Clarksville, Arkansas
Washington & Jefferson College alumni
21st-century American politicians
Politicians from Fairmont, West Virginia
Fairmont Senior High School alumni